Trapped! is the seventh studio album by German heavy metal band Rage. The album was remastered by Noise/Sanctuary in 2002 with five bonus tracks, two of which are from the EP Beyond the Wall.

Track listing

Personnel 
Band members
Peter "Peavy" Wagner – vocals, bass, co-producer
Manni Schmidt – guitars
Chris Efthimiadis – drums

Production
Sven Conquest – producer, engineer, strings arrangements
Ralf Krause – engineer, mixing
Tom Morris – mixing
Mike Fuller – mastering
Karl-Ulrich Walterbach – executive producer

References 

Rage (German band) albums
1992 albums
Noise Records albums